The Merano Open is a defunct, ATP Tour affiliated men's tennis tournament played for one year in 1999. It was held in Merano, Italy and was played on outdoor clay courts at Tennis Club Meran.

Finals

Singles

Doubles

References
Merano Open

ATP Tour
Defunct tennis tournaments in Italy
Clay court tennis tournaments
1999 in tennis
1999 in Italian tennis